Mohamed Abderrahmane Chamité is a Comorian professional football manager.

Career
Since September 2010 until September 2011 he coached the Comoros national football team.

References

External links

Profile at Soccerpunter.com

Year of birth missing (living people)
Living people
Comorian football managers
Comoros national football team managers
Place of birth missing (living people)